Lynn Schusterman (née Rothschild; born January 21, 1939) is an American billionaire philanthropist. She is the co-founder (with her late husband Charles) and chair of Charles and Lynn Schusterman Family Philanthropies, and founder of several other philanthropic initiatives including Schusterman Family Philanthropies – Israel, the ROI Community and Jerusalem Season of Culture (a.k.a. Mekudeshet).

Biography
Lynn Schusterman was born as Lynn Rothschild to a Jewish family on January 21, 1939, at Menorah Hospital in Kansas City, Missouri. She was raised in Oklahoma City, Oklahoma, where she attended Sunday school and was confirmed in the local B'nai Israel Reform synagogue. She has two younger sisters. Her mother, Amelia Mayer, was the daughter of Moses Emmanuel Mayer and Helen Loewen Mayer, of Iowa and Kansas, respectively.  Her father, Wes Rothschild, was a brother of Louis Rothschild who served in the Eisenhower Cabinet. Her parents divorced at an early age and she was raised by her mother and stepfather, Harold Josey, who ran an investment company called H.I. Josey & Company. Although Jewish, her family also celebrated Christmas and Easter. She graduated from the University of Miami in Coral Gables, Florida.

In 1962, she married Charles Schusterman, who was of Russian-Jewish origin. Charles grew up in Tulsa, the son of Sarah Goldstein, a Jewish emigrant from Riga, Latvia, and Sam Schusterman, a Jewish emigrant from Minsk, Belarus, who was in the used oilfield pipe equipment business. Charles graduated from the  University of Oklahoma. Charles and his brother later founded their own oil and gas company and then after dividing the business, Charles developed his portion of the company into the Samson Investment Company (named after his father), which eventually became one of the largest gas exploration and production companies in the country. Charles, now a billionaire, was diagnosed with leukemia in 1983 and died in 2000.

Philanthropy
In 1987, they started the Charles and Lynn Schusterman Family Foundation (renamed in 2021). The foundation donates 75 percent to Jewish causes around the world and 25 percent to Oklahoma needs. In 2011, Schusterman joined Warren Buffett, Bill Gates and others by signing the Giving Pledge. Schusterman's giving is focused on the global Jewish community, Israel and her hometown of Tulsa, Oklahoma.

One goal of Schusterman's philanthropy is to "improve lives, strengthen communities and advance equity". She is known for her work in strengthening Jewish identity, supporting young Jewish innovators, expanding opportunities for service learning and promoting inclusivity, especially within the Jewish LGBT community. Among the national Jewish organizations she supports are BBYO, Hillel, Moishe House, Birthright Israel, Repair the World and Keshet. In 1994, Schusterman helped to found a branch of Hillel: The Foundation for Jewish Campus Life in the Former Soviet Union in order to "reconnect thousands of Jews, once denied access to their heritage, with Judaism and the Jewish people."
Since 1998, she has authorized more than $6 million to the Israel Museum in Jerusalem, Israel, including a major grant to help with the renovation of the museum campus.

Schusterman also supports programs in "education, child advocacy and youth leadership in and around Tulsa, Oklahoma, and providing assistance to non-sectarian charitable organizations dedicated to enhancing the quality of life throughout Oklahoma." She is a supporter of Teach For America and Teach For All and was instrumental in establishing Teach For America to create a corps in Tulsa and Israel. Schusterman has also been deeply involved in the prevention and treatment of child abuse and neglect, both in Tulsa, OK, and in Jerusalem, where she helped to establish the Haruv Institute. in 2017 Haruv Institute establish the Haruv USA at OU Tulsa, in aim to share the Jerusalem Haruv Institute experience.

Among her largest single gifts were grants to Brandeis University to create the Schusterman Center for Israel Studies and to the University of Oklahoma to create the Schusterman Center campus in Tulsa. Schusterman also contributed $6 million to the Schusterman Center for Jewish Studies at The University of Texas at Austin.

Leadership
In addition to her philanthropy, Schusterman holds a variety of leadership positions in organizations such as BBYO, Hillel, Repair the World and the American Jewish Joint Distribution Committee. She is also a founding member of the Birthright Israel Foundation. 
 
In her hometown of Tulsa, Oklahoma, Schusterman serves on the advisory boards for the Foundation for Tulsa Schools and the Parent Child Center of Tulsa.

She has been published in the Jewish Week, the Forward, JTA, eJewishPhilanthropy, Contact and Tulsa World. Her reflection on family philanthropy appears in Voices from the Heartland, a collection of essays from 50 Oklahoma women, and she also contributed to A Dream of Zion: American Jews Reflect on Why Israel Matters to Them. Her work has been profiled in the global Jewish and secular press, including the Jerusalem Post, Haaretz, New York Times, Wall Street Journal and Huffington Post, and others.

Honors
In 2000, along with her late husband Charles, Schusterman was inducted into the Tulsa Hall of Fame; in 2003, into the Oklahoma Women's Hall of Fame; and in 2006, into the Oklahoma Hall of Fame.

In 2007 she received an honorary Doctorate of Humane Letters from the Hebrew Union College-Jewish Institute of Religion.
 
Schusterman was honored in 2008 with the Woodrow Wilson International Center for Scholars Public Service award and she has been named one of the "Forward 50" by the Forward newspaper five times.

A mother and grandmother, Schusterman has been a pioneer for women in philanthropy, and her charitable work stresses the importance of family, giving back to society and helping those who help themselves.

Personal life 
Schusterman has three children and six granddaughters:
Hal Schusterman, who lives in Israel
Stacy H. Schusterman, who lives in Tulsa  
Jay Schusterman, who lives with his wife Mary Lee in Boulder, Colorado.

Further reading
 Voices from the Heartland University of Oklahoma Press (September 14, 2007)  
 Upping the ante – Why I'm doubling down on the teen years
 An Open Letter For Martin Luther King Day: Give Back and Pay it Forward
 Answering the call to greatness
 Embrace LGBT Jews as vital members of the community
 Reflections on King's Day and the Jewish call to service
 Volunteerism is a rite of passage
 Budget cuts threaten the lives of our children
 Teens redefine relationships
 People & Places: TCC to honor Lynn, Stacy Schusterman
 Empowering young leaders in a 2.0 world
 Forward 50
 Invite the Extended Jewish Family For Rosh Hashanah
 Teach us to build and rebuild together
 The importance of the teen years
 Gifts that keep on giving
 The philanthropist from Oklahoma

References

External links
 Official Lynn Schusterman Bio
 Charles and Lynn Schusterman Family Philanthropies
 Charles and Lynn Schusterman Family Philanthropies – Israel
 Schusterman Center for Israel Studies
 ROI Community
 Voices of Oklahoma interview with Lynn Schusterman. First person interview conducted on September 14, 2010, with Lynn Schusterman.

1939 births
American billionaires
American philanthropists
American women in business
Giving Pledgers
21st-century philanthropists
Jewish American philanthropists
Living people
Businesspeople from Tulsa, Oklahoma
University of Miami alumni
Philanthropists from Massachusetts
21st-century American Jews
21st-century American women
Jewish women philanthropists